This is a list of prime ministers of Finland since the establishment of that office in 1917.

History
In 1918, the Finnish Senate was transformed into the Finnish Government, and the position of vice-chairman of the economic division of the Senate was transformed into the position of prime minister. Kesäranta (in Swedish Villa Bjälbo), located in the Meilahti neighborhood of Helsinki, has been the official residence of the prime minister of Finland since 1919.

Since its independence (declared on 6 December 1917), Finland has had 75 cabinets, including the current one, the longest lasting being the cabinet of Prime Minister Juha Sipilä, lasting 1,469 days.

Before the 1980s, cabinets tended to be short lived; the president was the most important political figure, and he had the right to form a new cabinet whenever he wanted. From the 1980s onwards, cabinets have tended to serve full terms (although the prime minister changed midterm in a few cases, most of the other cabinet members have remained nearly unchanged) and the prime minister has become more powerful a figure than the president. Under the current constitution, the prime minister is chosen by the parliament and only formally appointed by the president.

List of prime ministers
Finnish cabinets and prime ministers are numbered sequentially. A prime minister can serve as the head of multiple cabinets. For example, Matti Vanhanen is both the 39th and the 40th prime minister.

See also
Politics of Finland
Lists of incumbents
President of Finland
List of presidents of Finland
Senate of Finland

References

External links

Official site
From Senate to independent Government

-
Prime Minister
Finland